"Late Night" is a song by British rock band Foals, which was released as the third single from their third studio album Holy Fire. The song debuted on 13 December 2012 during the band's appearance on Channel 4's "Live from Abbey Road" sessions before the release of the album. A video for the single, directed by Nabil, was released on 11 March 2013.

Single artwork is by Leif Podhajsky.

Track listing

Charts

References

2013 singles
Foals songs
2013 songs
Transgressive Records singles
Song recordings produced by Alan Moulder
Music videos directed by Nabil Elderkin
Songs written by Yannis Philippakis